Pressley Larcus Blake (born August 18, 1936) is a former Canadian football player who played for the Edmonton Eskimos and Saskatchewan Roughriders. He played college football at the Mississippi State University.

References

1936 births
Living people
Edmonton Elks players
People from Greenwood, Mississippi
Mississippi State Bulldogs football players
Saskatchewan Roughriders players
Players of American football from Mississippi
American football ends
Canadian football wide receivers